Qatar competed at the 2000 Summer Paralympics in Sydney, Australia. 3 competitors from Qatar won no medals to finish joint 69th in the medal table along with all other countries who failed to win medals.

See also 
 Qatar at the Paralympics
 Qatar at the 2000 Summer Olympics

References 

Qatar at the Paralympics
2000 in Qatari sport
Nations at the 2000 Summer Paralympics